7.62×38mmR (also known as 7.62 mm Nagant and Cartridge, Type R) is an ammunition cartridge designed for use in the Russian Nagant M1895 revolver.

A small number of experimental submachine guns (e.g., Tokarev 1927), designed by Fedor Tokarev, were also produced in a 7.62 mm Nagant chambering. None, however, were accepted into Soviet service.

Background

The projectile is seated below the mouth of the cartridge, with the cartridge crimp sitting just above the bullet. When fired in the Nagant revolver, the crimp expands into the forcing cone, completing the gas seal and ostensibly increasing muzzle velocity by approximately 23 m/s (75 ft/s).

Commercially manufactured and loaded 7.62×38R cartridges are no longer difficult to find.

Most commercially loaded ammunition for the Nagant, including Fiocchi and the "СССР"-marked yellow box imports, are target ammunition, and do not have great stopping power. The low power of these rounds has given the Nagant a reputation as an underpowered sidearm. However, the original military ball cartridges fired bullets in the 6.5 g (100 grains) range at up to 330 m/s (1,100 ft/s), making them close to the .32-20 Winchester and .32 H&R Magnum in power. 
One advantage of the round, if proper brass can be found, is that it leaves the chambers totally clean, and there is no need to scrape lead and powder residue out.

Handloading
 

Many users of this caliber handload their own ammunition. The proper brass cases are also expensive and difficult to come by. Handloaders have had success using dies for the .32-20 and .30 Carbine to handload the rounds. 32-20 brass cases are inexpensive, readily available, and can be reformed and used safely in guns chambered for 7.62×38R, but the resulting cartridges are too short to achieve the gas seal. Cut down 223 brass reformed in 30 carbine dies can be utilized to load for the Nagant also. These will achieve the gas seal, but the case rims will be undersized.

Three other cartridges—.32 S&W, .32 S&W Long, and .32 H&R Magnum—will also generally chamber and fire in the revolver, but will not achieve the gas seal. The case head of the .32 S&W/H&R is about the same size as the case diameter of the Nagant cartridge, so the case head will sometimes actually end up moving into the chamber, thus preventing an adequate primer strike. Due to the dimensional differences between these cartridges and the original 7.62×38R cartridge, this practice is done at the shooter's own risk. The .32 H&R Magnum in particular develops much higher pressures than the 7.62 Nagant or either of the .32 S&W cartridges, which are both late 19th century developments. The most common anomaly when firing these cartridges is bulged cases.

Producers

 Second Polish Republic - From 1929 until 1939
 - Fiocchi manufactures cartridges in this chambering; they fire 6.4 g (98 gr) FMJ bullets at about 260 m/s (850 ft/s), which works out to an energy of 213 J (157 ft·lbf)—comparable to a .32 ACP semi-automatic.
 - Prvi Partizan, a Serbian company produces a 7.62×38R load similar to Fiocchi's, originally under the "HotShot" brand but now under the standard Prvi Partizan label.

See also
7.62 mm caliber
7 mm caliber
List of handgun cartridges
Table of handgun and rifle cartridges

References

7.62×38mmR firearms
Pistol and rifle cartridges
Military cartridges
Rimmed cartridges